Kaničky is a municipality and village in Domažlice District in the Plzeň Region of the Czech Republic. It has about 30 inhabitants.

Gallery

References

Villages in Domažlice District